Ruthenium(III) acetate, commonly known as basic ruthenium acetate, describes a family of salts where the cation has the formula [Ru3O(O2CCH3)6(OH2)3]+.  A representative derivative is the dihydrate of the tetrafluoroborate salt [Ru3O(O2CCH3)6(OH2)3]BF4(H2O)2, which is the source of the data in the table above. This and related salts are forest green, air-stable solids that are soluble in alcohols.

Basic ruthenium acetate features octahedral Ru(III) centers, a triply bridging oxo ligand, six acetate ligands, and three aquo ligands.  The same structure is shared with basic acetates of iron, chromium, iridium, and manganese.

Preparation and reactions
It is prepared by heating ruthenium trichloride in acetic acid in the presence of sodium acetate.  The basic acetates of ruthenium were reported in the early 1950s but were not properly formulated.

Basic ruthenium acetate reacts with many ligands such as triphenylphosphine and pyridine concomitant with reduction.  These derivatives [Ru3O(O2CCH3)6L3]0 are mixed valence compounds.

Related compounds

Diruthenium tetraacetate chloride

References 

Ruthenium(III) compounds
Acetates